Kramer Island is an ice-covered island,  long, in the Marshall Archipelago, Antarctica. It lies between Nolan Island and Court Ridge in the Sulzberger Ice Shelf. The island was mapped by the United States Geological Survey from surveys and U.S. Navy air photos, 1959–65, and was named by the Advisory Committee on Antarctic Names for Michael S. Kramer, a meteorologist at Byrd Station, 1968.

See also 
 List of Antarctic and sub-Antarctic islands

References

Islands of Marie Byrd Land